Fragma is the debut album by Brazilian singer and pianist Amanda Magalhães, released on 16 September 2020. With Fragma, Magalhães says she intended to "unite [...] the tropical swing of Brazilian rhythms and the American black music feel". The album was entirely written and produced by her and she defined it as "an album that talks about affection and brings the stages of my affectionate life, filled with black music, samba and MPB".

Fragma was announced in 2018 for a May 2019 release. In May 2020, it was announced that it would be released in June of that year. On the same month, the release date was postponed to July. It was finally released on 16 September via Boia Fria Produções and distributed by Ditto Music.

Singles 
The first single to be released was "Saiba", on 4 November 2019, featuring Seu Jorge on co-lead vocals, Vico Piovani on the acoustic guitar, Rodrigo Tavares on organ and clavinet and Tuto Ferraz on drums and percussion. Magalhães herself sings and plays the Rhodes piano. The single received a video on 20 of the following month, in which both singers sing and act.

Em 18 May 2020, she released another single, "O Amor Te Dá" (Love Gives You), also featuring Vico (acoustic guitar, bass, programming and arrangement) and Tuto (drums and percussion) and the addition of Leo Mendes on the acoustic guitar.

The third single, "Talismã", features Liniker and was released with a video on the same day of the album.

Track listing

Personnel 
Adapted from several sources.

 Amanda Magalhães — lead vocals and piano on all tracks
 Liniker — lead vocals on "Talismã"
 Seu Jorge — lead vocals on "Saiba"
 Vico Piovani — acoustic guitar and/or bass on all tracks except "Deixa Assim Por Ora"
 Leo Mendes — acoustic guitar on "O Amor Te Dá"
 Rodrigo Tavares — organ and clavinet on "Saiba"
 Tuto Ferraz — drums and percussion on all tracks except 1, 7 and 9
 Todinei — on "Deixar Levar"
 Sthe Araujo — on "Quando a Chuva Acaba"

References 

Portuguese-language albums
Música Popular Brasileira albums
2020 debut albums
Amanda Magalhães albums